Gamasellus pulcherimus is a species of mite in the family Ologamasidae.

References

pulcherimus
Articles created by Qbugbot
Animals described in 1982